Ronald Martin may refer to:

Ronald Martin (American football) (born 1993), American football strong safety
Ronnie Martin (drag racer), American drag racer
Ronnie Martin (ice hockey) (1907–1971), ice hockey player
Ronnie Martin (Joy Electric)
Whitey Martin (born 1939), basketball player

See also
Ron Martin (disambiguation)